"Going Deep" is a 2011 single by British electronic act Chicane. It features British producer and rapper Aggi Dukes on vocals. It is the lead single from Chicane's fifth studio album Thousand Mile Stare.

Music video
A music video to accompany the release of "Going Deep" was first released onto YouTube on 8 July 2011 at a total length of three minutes and twenty-four seconds.

Track listing

Chart performance

Release history

References

2011 singles
Chicane (musician) songs
2011 songs
Songs written by Chicane (musician)